The 2022 Dutch Basketball Supercup was the 10th edition of the Dutch Basketball Supercup. The game was played on 28 September 2022 in the Maaspoort in 's-Hertogenbosch. The defending Dutch champions Heroes Den Bosch easily defeated Donar, winners of the 2021–22 Dutch Basketball Cup. Heroes won its third Supercup title. Vernon Taylor of Donar was the top scorer of the game with 20 points, while Heroes player Chris-Ebou Ndow was named MVP of the game.

Match details

References 

Dutch Basketball Supercup
Supercup